Michael Edward Hartley (born August 31, 1961) is an American former professional baseball right-handed pitcher who played in Major League Baseball (MLB) from 1989 to 1995.

Signed as an amateur free agent by the St. Louis Cardinals in 1981, Hartley would make his MLB debut with the Los Angeles Dodgers on September 10, 1989, and appear in his final big league game on September 24, 1995. In 1994, he pitched in Japan for the Chiba Lotte Marines of Nippon Professional Baseball (NPB).

From 2005 to 2007, Hartley was a pitching coach for the independent Reno Silver Sox. From 2008 to 2010, he was the head coach for the Heidenheim Heideköpfe a German first league team. Hartley lead the team to become the 2009 German National Champions. In 2010, Heidekoepfe  finished 2nd in the Final Four European Championship. In 2011, Hartley became the head coach for the Croatian National Team and won the European Championship Qualifier. In 2012, he became the head coach of Grosseto Baseball in the Italian Baseball League.

References

External links

1961 births
Living people
Baseball players from California
Los Angeles Dodgers players
Philadelphia Phillies players
Minnesota Twins players
Boston Red Sox players
Baltimore Orioles players
Major League Baseball pitchers
American expatriate baseball players in Japan
Chiba Lotte Marines players
Sportspeople from Hawthorne, California
Johnson City Cardinals players
St. Petersburg Cardinals players
Erie Cardinals players
Macon Redbirds players
Springfield Cardinals players
Savannah Cardinals players
Albuquerque Dukes players
San Antonio Dodgers players
Bakersfield Dodgers players
Scranton/Wilkes-Barre Red Barons players
Pawtucket Red Sox players
Rochester Red Wings players
Mesa Miners players
Reno Chukars players
American expatriate baseball players in Italy
Nettuno Baseball Club players
American expatriate baseball players in Germany